Pekatahi is a small locality south of Whakatāne in the Bay of Plenty region of New Zealand's North Island. The Whakatāne River passes through Pekatahi as it flows northwards to its mouth on the Pacific Ocean.

State Highway 2 passes through the locality on its route between Awakeri and Tāneatua, as does the Tāneatua Branch railway line (currently disused).

External links
 Photo gallery that includes images of the Pekatahi road-rail bridge

Whakatane District
Populated places in the Bay of Plenty Region